Olga Menchik (Menčíková, Menčik) Rubery  (2 May 1907, Moscow – 26 June 1944, Clapham, London) was a Czech–British female chess master.

Born in Moscow to a Czech father and a British mother, she was younger sister to Vera Menchik. They all moved to England in 1921. In January 1927, Vera won the London ladies championship, and Olga took second place.

She took fourth place in the fifth Women's World Chess Championship at Warsaw 1935, and tied for 17-20th in the sixth WWCC at Stockholm 1937 (Vera Menchik won both events).

In 1938 she married a British man, Clifford Glanville Rubery.  Olga, aged 37, her sister and their mother were killed in a bombing raid when a German V-1 flying bomb hit her home at 47 Gauden Road, Clapham, south London, in 1944.

References

1907 births
1944 deaths
Russian female chess players
Czech female chess players
Czechoslovak female chess players
English female chess players
British female chess players
Sportspeople from Moscow
Deaths by airstrike during World War II
Russian people of Czech descent
Russian people of English descent
Emigrants from the Russian Empire to the United Kingdom
20th-century chess players
British civilians killed in World War II